Liroa is a monotypic genus of fungi found in the family Microbotryaceae. It contains the single species Liroa emodensis, common name Microbotryum emodensis.

The genus name of Liroa is in honour of Johan Ivar Lindroth (1872-1943), who was a Finnish botanist (Mycology) and phytopathologist.

The genus was circumscribed by Raffaele Ciferri in Nuovo Giorn. Bot. Ital. ser.2, vol.40 on page 263 in 1933.

References

External links

Monotypic Basidiomycota genera
Microbotryales